Ocularia undulatovittata is a species of beetle in the family Cerambycidae. It was described by Stephan von Breuning in 1967. It is known from Democratic Republic of the Congo.

References

Oculariini
Beetles described in 1967
Taxa named by Stephan von Breuning (entomologist)
Endemic fauna of the Democratic Republic of the Congo